Carmen Guerricagoitia McLean (born September 25, 1976) is an American lawyer and jurist serving as an associate judge of the Superior Court of the District of Columbia.

Early life and education 

McLean was born in Ontario, Oregon. She received a Bachelor of Science degree from George Fox University in 1998 and a Juris Doctor from the Georgetown University Law Center in 2001.

Career 

In 2001, she began her career as an associate at Jones Day. She served as partner from 2011 to 2019. She was active in firm management and leadership and served as the co-chair of the Diversity Committee and as the Pro Bono and Public Service Partner for Jones Day's Washington, D.C., office.

In 2012, McLean received the Pro Bono Lawyer of the Year Award from the District of Columbia Bar.

D.C. Superior Court 
On September 27, 2016, President Barack Obama nominated McLean to be a judge on the Superior Court of the District of Columbia. Her nomination, which was not acted upon prior to the end of the 114th Congress, expired.

On October 30, 2017, McLean was nominated by President Donald Trump to a 15-year term as an associate judge on the same court. She was confirmed by the U.S. Senate on January 2, 2019. She was sworn in on May 3, 2019.

Personal life
McLean is married and has two children.

References

External links
 Biography at Superior Court of the District of Columbia

1976 births
Living people
21st-century American judges
21st-century American lawyers
21st-century American women lawyers
George Fox University alumni
Georgetown University Law Center alumni
Jones Day people
Judges of the Superior Court of the District of Columbia
Lawyers from Washington, D.C.
People from Ontario, Oregon
21st-century American women judges